David Freeman Wooley is an American director, producer, author and entrepreneur based in Wilmington, Delaware. His most notable accomplishments include long-standing work with Dionne Warwick, and collaborations with Julius "Dr. J" Erving.

Career 
Wooley launched his career in the entertainment industry as a teenage drummer, recording with professionals including gospel singer Cissy Houston. He also spent seven years as president and co-owner of DJ Group, a sports entertainment company, along with Julius "Dr J" Erving. As a producer, Wooley has worked with Stevie Wonder, James Brown, Run-DMC, Loretta Lynn, and Tony Bennett.

His most extensive collaborations are with Dionne Warwick, having produced events for over 20 years, co-written three books with her—among them the autobiography My Life, As I See It—and produced her 50th anniversary gala at Lincoln Center. He also wrote, produced, and co-directed the documentary Dionne Warwick: Don’t Make Me Over. The film received a standing ovation at the Toronto International Film Festival and won first runner-up for the People's Choice Award for Documentaries, later also winning the Best Feature honor at the Gene Siskel Film Center's Black Harvest Film Festival, receiving Centerpiece Screening at DOC NYC, and landing the Audience Award at the 2021 Montclair Film Festival. In a positive review of the documentary, Victor Stiff of That Shelf wrote, "[Co-director David Heilbroner] and Wooley pack their film with everything you want from a musical documentary: fantastic music, a one-of-a-kind star, and deep-cut stories from family and friends. It’s an inspiring tale of overcoming the odds, filled with beautiful music and prudent life lessons along the way.” The documentary premiered on CNN on January 1, 2023, debuting at #1 among cable news viewers aged 25-54.  It will be available on HBO Max following the broadcast.   

Wooley's career has extended into the sports sector. He rose to prominence as the only Black man in the country to be awarded exclusive paid-per-view and closed-circuit television broadcasting rights for several entire states to the Mike Tyson versus Michael Spinks "Once And For All" match – the largest fight in history at the time. He was subsequently featured in the 2021 documentary series Mike Tyson: The Knockout.

Wooley was the sole producer who came up with the idea for "The Clash of the Legends," a paid-per view TV hoopfest of 1992, which pitted retired NBA basketball players Julius "Dr. J" Erving and Kareem Abdul-Jabbar against one another. Wooley described the event as a spiritual descendent of the one-on-one games played between neighborhood legends in his native Harlem. Proceeds from the event went to benefit the American Foundation for AIDS Research, as well as the Magic Johnson Foundation, a charity established by the retired Laker star to battle against the HIV virus.

Awards and recognition 
In 2009, Wooley's children's book Say a Little Prayer—co-authored with Warwick and Tonya Bolden, and illustrated by Soud—was nominated for the NAACP Image Award for Outstanding Literary Work, Children's. In October 2015, then-Wilmington Mayor Dennis Williams formally honored Wooley for his work promoting Wilmington, in particular the creation of the Clifford Brown Jazz Festival. In 2020, Wooley was named Talent/Content Advisor for the Biden/Harris Presidential Inaugural Committee. In 2022, the city of Wilmington performed a street naming ceremony in Wooley's honor, designating the corner of 16th and Claymont Street "David F. Wooley Way."

Personal life 
Wooley grew up in Harlem, New York, before relocating to Wilmington. He has two daughters: Veda, a practicing attorney, and Davina, who received an MS in Computer Science from Georgia Tech. He has been an adjunct professor at Wilmington University’s College of Business since 1996, where he teaches business and marketing classes.

References 

21st-century American writers
American businesspeople
American directors
American producers
Film directors from Delaware
Film producers from Delaware
Living people
Writers from Delaware
Year of birth missing (living people)